Graham Girvan (born 24 April 1990) is a Scottish football defender.

Career

Girvan began his career with Ross County, and had a trial with Bolton Wanderers in March 2007. Girvan made his senior debut in a Scottish Second Division match against Alloa Athletic in April 2008, after County had won promotion to the Scottish First Division. He captained the under-19 side during his time at County.

Girvan went on to make only 7 appearances over the next two seasons with Ross County, and left the club in May 2010, signing for Clyde. He only stayed with Clyde for a year, being released at the end of the season.

References

External links

1990 births
Living people
Scottish footballers
Ross County F.C. players
Clyde F.C. players
Arbroath F.C. players
Petershill F.C. players
Scottish Football League players
Footballers from Glasgow
Association football defenders
Scottish Junior Football Association players